Elections to the Rajasthan Legislative Assembly were held in March 1972, to elect members of the 184 constituencies in Rajasthan, India. The Indian National Congress won a majority of seats as well as the popular vote, and its leader, Barkatullah Khan was reappointed as the Chief Minister of Rajasthan.

After the passing of The Delimitation of Parliamentary and Assembly Constituencies Order, 1961, Rajasthan's Legslative Assembly was assigned 176 constituencies. This was increased to 184 constituencies by 1967.

Result

Elected Members

See also 
 List of constituencies of the Rajasthan Legislative Assembly
 1972 elections in India

References

Rajasthan
1972
1972